Thomas Chance Morris (born February 15, 1994), better known as Sodapoppin, is an American Twitch streamer and YouTuber. He has one of the largest followings on Twitch, with over 8.7 million followers and over 398.3 million views as of August 15, 2022; he also has over 1.11 million subscribers and over 444.5 million views on YouTube. According to Social Blade, Morris sits at the number 10 spot for the most followers on Twitch; he also ranks number 15 for the largest total number of views on the platform. He is a co-owner of and content creator for gaming organization One True King.

Career
Morris began streaming on Twitch in 2012 after switching from Xfire. He was a successful World of Warcraft player, reaching top rank with over half of Twitch's WoW followers viewing him. Morris streamed other games before switching to online gambling.

In 2014 and 2015, Morris was streaming blackjack gambling on casino websites, winning and losing thousands of dollars on any given day. In May 2015, Morris lost $5,000 on one hand with over 43,000 viewers watching him.

Morris co-owned Canadian esports organization Northern Gaming, which was founded in May 2016. In August 2017, the organization was purchased by NRG Esports, which is owned by Shaquille O'Neal, Alex Rodriguez, and others. Morris subsequently joined its ownership group and became an advisor of NRG Esports. In regards to Northern Gaming's short-lived career, Esports Insider stated, "It's the end of a short road for Northern Gaming, but their story will be looked back on as an example of achieving quick success in esports."

Morris eliminated fellow streamer Dr Disrespect out of the H1Z1 Invitational tournament in October 2017. Nonetheless, Morris failed to make the top ten.

Morris has been credited for causing a spike in popularity of social deduction game Among Us, which was originally released in 2018 but exploded in popularity in the Summer 2020 during the COVID-19 pandemic. According to Forest Willard, programmer and co-founder of Innersloth, "The first thing we really noticed was a Twitch stream from Sodapoppin. We had various moments where we were like, 'We're doing well,' but it was that point where we saw that a lot of people and other streamers started to climb onboard."

On July 21, 2022, gaming organization One True King announced Morris as their newest member and co-owner.

Awards and nominations

See also 
 List of most-followed Twitch channels

References

External links
 

American esports players
Living people
World of Warcraft players
Twitch (service) streamers
1994 births
YouTubers from Texas